Otopleura is a genus of  minute to medium-sized sea snails, marine gastropod mollusk in the family Pyramidellidae, the pyrams and their allies.

Species
Species within the genus Otopleura include:
 Otopleura auriscati (Holten, 1802)
 Otopleura glans (Reeve, 1843)
 Otopleura mitralis (A. Adams, 1855)
 Otopleura nitida (A. Adams in H. & A. Adams, 1853–58)
 Otopleura nodicincta (A. Adams, 1855)
Species brought into synonymy
 Otopleura australis Laseron, 1959: synonym of Otopleura mitralis (A. Adams, 1854)

Distribution
Species of this genus can be found throughout the Pacific Ocean.

References

 Vaught, K.C. (1989). A classification of the living Mollusca. American Malacologists: Melbourne, FL (USA). . XII, 195 pp

Pyramidellidae